Fulham War Memorial is a Grade II listed monument at Vicarage Garden, Fulham High Street, Fulham, London.

It was built in 1921 and designed by the sculptor Alfred Turner, and comprises a bronze figure of Peace on top of a high Portland stone pedestal with three steps. There is also a bronze kneeling figure of a cherub against a rough cross on base. The inscription is "To the Honour of Fulham's Gallant Dead" "They died for freedom" 1914–1918 and 1939–1945.

References

Grade II listed buildings in the London Borough of Hammersmith and Fulham
World War I memorials in England
World War II memorials in England
Buildings and structures completed in 1921
Military memorials in London